Colterol is a short-acting β2-adrenoreceptor agonist.   Bitolterol, a prodrug for colterol, is used in the management of bronchospasm in asthma and chronic obstructive pulmonary disease (COPD).

References 

Beta2-adrenergic agonists